The 2009 European Parliament election in Italy took place on 6–7 June 2009.

The People of Freedom was largest party in Friuli-Venezia Giulia with 31.8%, followed by the Democratic Party (25.6%) and Lega Nord (17.5%).

Results
Source: Ministry of the Interior

2009 elections in Italy
Elections in Friuli-Venezia Giulia
European Parliament elections in Italy
2009 European Parliament election